Soini is a municipality of Finland.

It is located in the Southern Ostrobothnia region.

Neighbouring municipalities are Alajärvi, Karstula, Kyyjärvi, Saarijärvi and Ähtäri.

The municipality is unilingually Finnish.

History 
The name is derived from the male name Soini, a Finnish variant of the Scandinavian name Sven. The village was first mentioned in 1754 as a part of the Alajärvi parish. Soini gained a chapel in 1784 and a church in 1859. It was fully separated from Alajärvi in 1895. Soini originally had a Swedish name, Konungsåby, which referred to the river Kuninkaanjoki.

People born in Soini
Aukusti Mäenpää (1891 – 1933)
Eino Uusitalo (1924 – 2015)
Pekka Pesola (1925 – 2009)
Jorma Huuhtanen (1945 – )
Aulis Akonniemi (1958 – )
Merja Korpela (1981 – )
Noora Hautakangas (1984 – )

References

External links

Municipality of Soini – Official website

Municipalities of South Ostrobothnia
Populated places established in 1868